Jules Monsallier (23 January 1907 – 4 September 1972) was a French footballer. He played in three matches for the France national football team between 1928 and 1936.

References

External links
 

1907 births
1972 deaths
French footballers
France international footballers
Place of birth missing
Association football forwards
Stade Français (association football) players
Red Star F.C. players
Club Français players
FC Sète 34 players
Toulouse FC players
OGC Nice players
Olympic footballers of France
Footballers at the 1928 Summer Olympics